The fifth edition of the Copa América de Ciclismo was held on 9 January 2005 in São Paulo, Brazil.

Results

References 
 cyclingnews

Copa América de Ciclismo
Copa
Copa
January 2005 sports events in South America